Polsat 2 is a Polish pay television channel. Owned by Telewizja Polsat, it is a sister to the main Polsat channel.

History 
On 18 December 2015, Polsat 2 was replaced by Polsat 1 abroad and Polsat 2 remained for viewers available in Poland.

On 6 April 2020 Polsat 2 changed its logo and graphics along with other neighbouring Polsat channels.

The logo was changed again, on August 30, 2021, with the major rebranding of Polsat 2, and its television channels.

References

External links
 

 
Television channels in Poland
Television channels and stations established in 1997
1997 establishments in Poland
Polish-language television stations
Mass media in Warsaw